The 2011 Trophée des champions was the 16th edition of the French super cup. The match was to be contested by the winners of Ligue 1 the previous season, Lille, and the defending Coupe de France champions. However, due to Lille also winning the Coupe de France the previous season, the club faced the runners-up of the previous league campaign Marseille. The match was played, for the third consecutive season, on international soil at the Stade de Tanger in Tanger, Morocco. Like the previous two seasons, the idea was to promote French football abroad, but this time more specifically in Africa and the Arab world. The match was televised live on Canal+ in France and throughout 77 countries in the world, a new record for country viewership. On 21 July 2011, it was confirmed by the Ligue de Football Professionnel that Bouchaïb El Ahrach would officiate the match.
Marseille trailed Lille by 3–1 with five minutes to go but came back to win 5–4.

Match

Details

See also 
 2010–11 Ligue 1
 2010–11 Coupe de France

References

External links 
 Official site 

Trophee des champions
2011
Lille OSC matches
Olympique de Marseille matches
Trophée des Champions
International club association football competitions hosted by Morocco
July 2011 sports events in Africa
Sport in Tangier